Paul May (born 20 June 1935) is a Luxembourgian footballer. He played in 24 matches for the Luxembourg national football team from 1958 to 1965.

References

External links
 

1935 births
Living people
Luxembourgian footballers
Luxembourg international footballers
Place of birth missing (living people)
Association footballers not categorized by position